Max Rules is a 2004 kids' action-adventure feature film written and directed by Robert Burke.

Synopsis
Max (Andrew C. Maier) and his friends Jessica (Jennifer Lancheros) and Scott (Spencer Esau) find thrills in spying on their families, sneaking into each other's houses, and organizing elaborate pranks at school.  They have unique access to some of the most sophisticated equipment in the world, thanks to Max's Uncle, Rick Brinkley (William B. Davis), developer of top-secret equipment for the government.  When Max discovers information about the whereabouts of a stolen FBI microchip, he and his friends use their skills and cutting edge technology to embark on the most dangerous mission of their lives.

Production
Filming took place in Seattle and Bellevue, Washington.

Festivals
Tribeca Film Festival
Seattle International Film Festival
Salento International Film Festival - Salento, Italy
HBO New York International Latino Film Festival
Children's Film Festival - Cologne, Germany
Seoul International Youth Film Festival
Schlingel International Film Festival for Children
Hannover Children's Film Festival
Fort Lauderdale International Film Festival
Staten Island Film Festival

References

External links

VVS Films
Jumpshot Films
Netflix
Scholastic

2004 films
2004 comedy films
Films set in Seattle
2000s English-language films
American children's films
American action adventure films
2000s American films